Abdur Jamal is a masculine Muslim name. Abdur Jamal, Abdul Jamal, or variants may  refer to:

 Abdul Jamal Shah of Pahang (died 1575), the Sultan of Pahang, Malaysia
 Temenggong Abdul Jamal (1720–1802), the first Temenggong of Johor, Malaysia

See also
 Abdul Jalal, chief of police, Kunar Province, Afghanistan
 Abdul Jamil, a Muslim given name of Arabic origin